= Southern Ute Boarding School =

The Southern Ute Boarding School was an American Indian boarding school located near Ignacio, Colorado, in operation from 1886 to 1920. The campus remained in intermittent use as a school until its closure in 1981. It was one of six American Indian boarding schools operated in Colorado. At least 57 documented Ute student deaths occurred at the school, which was part of a larger initiative by the Bureau of Indian Affairs to assimilate Native American children. The Ute tribe has worked to preserve the remains of the campus; however, in 2023, the Southern Ute Tribal Council approved the demolition of the Ute Vocational School-Head Start building on the site.
